Order of Military Merits was a state decoration awarded in Yugoslavia, divided into three classes. It was awarded to commanders of units and civilians serving in the Yugoslav People's Army, as well as individuals in trade unions or other organizations with outstanding contributions and accomplishment of tasks of special immediate importance for national defense.

History 
The order was established by the Presidium of the National Assembly of Yugoslavia on 29 December 1951 together with the Medal for Military Merits and awarded until the breakup of Yugoslavia in 1992. The number of times it was awarded has last been documented on 31 December 1985. The three classes of the order ranked as following in their importance, per the Law on Decorations of the FPR Yugoslavia from 1 March 1961:
 Order of Military Merits with Great Star – Class I, 16th in order of importance, awarded 2,609 times
 Order of Military Merits with Golden Swords – Class II, 26th in order of importance, awarded 24,141 times
 Order of Military Merits with Silver Swords – Class III, 34th in order of importance, awarded 94,684 times

After the breakup of SFR Yugoslavia, the new union of Serbia and Montenegro, formally Federal Republic of Yugoslavia, established an equivalent Order of Merit in the Field of Defense and Security on 4 December 1998. It looked the same, but the red star was replaced with the Coat of arms of Serbia and Montenegro and torches behind the shield were removed.

Gallery

References

Literature
 
 
 
 
 
 

Orders, decorations, and medals of Yugoslavia
Awards established in 1951
1951 establishments in Yugoslavia
1992 disestablishments in Yugoslavia
Awards disestablished in 1992